U-ka saegusa IN db III is the third studio album by Japanese group U-ka Saegusa in dB.

Background
The album includes 7 previously released singles since Tobitatenai Watashi ni Anata ga Tsubasa wo Kureta till Everybody. The album was released on September 20, 2006 under Giza Studio label. It was released in two versions: a limited CD+DVD edition and a regular CD only edition.

Charting performance
The album reached #19 rank in Oricon for first week. It charted for 5 weeks and totally sold 19,213 copies.

Track listing

Usage in media
The song June Bride ~Anata Shika Mienai~ was used as outro theme for anime Detective Conan
The song Tobitatenai Watashi ni Anata ga Tsubasa wo Kureta was used as ending theme for program Ultraman Nexus aired at Tokyo Broadcasting System Television
The song Kimi no Ai ni Tsutsumarete Itai and Ai no Wana was used as intro theme for anime Kakutō Bishin Ūron
The song 100 Mono Tobira was used as intro theme for anime Detective Conan
The song Everybody Jump and was used as opening theme for anime Kakutō Bishin Ūron Rebirth
The song Fall in Love was used as ending theme for anime Kakutō Bishin Ūron Rebirth

References 

2006 albums
Being Inc. albums
Giza Studio albums
Japanese-language albums
U-ka Saegusa in dB albums
Albums produced by Daiko Nagato